Logo Anseba is the capital of Logo Anseba Subregion.

External links
Reliefweb.int
Fivims.net
Mapygon

Gash-Barka Region